Sergio Rodríguez Cidoncha (born 5 October 1989) is a Spanish professional footballer who plays for Andorran club FC Santa Coloma as a left-back.

Club career
Born in Mérida, Extremadura, Rodríguez moved from his hometown club Mérida UD to Levante UD as a youth, and made his senior debut for the latter's reserves on 13 April 2008 in a 3–2 home loss against CF Gavà in the Segunda División B, adding three more appearances in a season that ended with relegation. He remained in that level the next three years, in service of Granada CF, Valencia CF Mestalla (who also descended) and UD Melilla.

Rodríguez signed for SD Ponferradina in 2011, helping them to promotion to Segunda División in his first year. His first professional match took place on 1 September 2012, when he came on as a substitute for Didac for the final 14 minutes of a 1–0 away defeat to Girona FC. He totalled 57 competitive games during his spell at the Estadio El Toralín, including eight in the Copa del Rey.

After leaving for division-three team Real Oviedo on a two-year deal on 2 July 2013, Rodríguez continued competing at that tier for the vast majority of his career, representing in quick succession Sestao River Club, Marbella FC, Extremadura UD and Coruxo FC; he also played with CF Lorca Deportiva in the Tercera División.

References

External links

1989 births
Living people
People from Mérida, Spain
Sportspeople from the Province of Badajoz
Spanish footballers
Footballers from Extremadura
Association football defenders
Segunda División players
Segunda División B players
Tercera División players
Atlético Levante UD players
Granada CF footballers
Valencia CF Mestalla footballers
UD Melilla footballers
SD Ponferradina players
Real Oviedo players
Sestao River footballers
Marbella FC players
Extremadura UD footballers
CF Lorca Deportiva players
Coruxo FC players
Uzbekistan Super League players
Surkhon Termez players
Primera Divisió players
FC Santa Coloma players
Spanish expatriate footballers
Expatriate footballers in Uzbekistan
Expatriate footballers in Andorra
Spanish expatriate sportspeople in Andorra